A Ripple from the Storm (1958) is the third novel in British Nobel Prize in Literature-winner Doris Lessing five volume, semi-autobiographical, series, Children of Violence. The first volume is Martha Quest (1952), and the others are, A Proper Marriage (1954), Landlocked (1965), and The Four-Gated City (1969). The Children of Violence series, follows the life of protagonist Martha Quest "from girlhood to middle age".

A Ripple in the Storm describes the growth of a Communist group in a small town in Central Africa, "as a result of the general mood of optimism, enthusiasm and admiration for the Soviet Union current in the years 1942, 1943 and 1944."  Martha Quest, now divorced from her husband, joins the communists and marries its leader, who is a German refugee.

There are obvious parallels with Doris Lessing's own life, because after she divorced her first husband, she joined the Left Book Club in 1943. It was here that she met her future second husband, Gottfried Lessing, a refugee from Germany.

References

Novels by Doris Lessing
Novels set in Rhodesia
Zimbabwean novels
1958 British novels
Michael Joseph books